Christoffersen Heights are broad snow-covered heights which form the south-central portion of the Jones Mountains, southward of Bonnabeau Dome and Anderson Dome. They were mapped by the University of Minnesota Jones Mountains Party, 1960–61, and named by the Advisory Committee on Antarctic Names for Lieutenant Ernest H. Christoffersen, U.S. Navy Reserve, co-pilot of ski-equipped LC-47 Dakota aircraft on pioneering flights from Byrd Station to the Eights Coast area in November 1961.

See also
 Mountains in Antarctica

References
 

Mountains of Ellsworth Land